Guatemala competed at the 2022 World Aquatics Championships in Budapest, Hungary from 17 June to 3 July.

Open water swimming

Guatemala qualified one male and one female open water swimmers.

Men

Women

Swimming

Guatemala entered two swimmers.

Men

Women

References

World Aquatics Championships
2022
Nations at the 2022 World Aquatics Championships